Tjapko may refer to:

Tjapko Poppens, a Dutch politician
Tjapko van Bergen, a Dutch rower

Dutch masculine given names